Robert Lee Zemeckis (born May 14, 1952) is an American filmmaker. He first came to public attention as the director of the action-adventure romantic comedy Romancing the Stone (1984), the science-fiction comedy Back to the Future film trilogy (1985–1990), and the live-action/animated comedy Who Framed Roger Rabbit (1988). He subsequently directed the satirical black comedy Death Becomes Her (1992) and then diversified into more dramatic fare, including Forrest Gump (1994), for which he won the Academy Award for Best Director and the film won Best Picture. He has directed films across a wide variety of genres, for both adults and families.

Zemeckis is regarded as an innovator in visual effects. His exploration of state-of-the-art special effects includes the early use of insertion of computer graphics into live-action footage in Back to the Future Part II (1989) and Forrest Gump, the insertion of hand-drawn animation into live-action footage in Who Framed Roger Rabbit, and the pioneering performance capture techniques seen in The Polar Express (2004), Monster House (2006), Beowulf (2007), A Christmas Carol (2009), and Welcome to Marwen (2018). Though interest in Zemeckis has at times been solely limited to his work with special effects, his work has been praised by several film critics, including David Thomson, who wrote that "no other contemporary director has used special effects to more dramatic and narrative purpose."

Early life
Robert Lee Zemeckis was born on May 14, 1952, in Chicago the son of Rosa (née Nespeca) and Alphonse Zemeckis. His father was Lithuanian-American while his mother was Italian-American. 

Zemeckis grew up on the South Side of the city. He attended a Catholic grade school and Fenger Academy High School. Zemeckis has said "the truth was that in my family there was no art. I mean, there was no music, there were no books, there was no theater... The only thing I had that was inspirational, was television—and it actually was."

As a child, he loved television and was fascinated by his parents' 8 mm film home movie camera. Starting off by filming family events like birthdays and holidays, he gradually began producing narrative films with his friends that incorporated stop-motion work and other special effects. Along with enjoying movies, Zemeckis remained an avid TV watcher. "You hear so much about the problems with television," he said, "but I think that it saved my life." Television gave Zemeckis his first glimpse of a world outside of his blue-collar upbringing; specifically, he learned of the existence of film schools on an episode of The Tonight Show Starring Johnny Carson. 

After seeing Bonnie and Clyde with his father and being heavily influenced by it, Zemeckis decided that he wanted to go to film school. His parents disapproved of the idea, Zemeckis later said, "But only in the sense that they were concerned... for my family and my friends and the world that I grew up in, this was the kind of dream that really was impossible. My parents would sit there and say, 'Don't you see where you come from? You can't be a movie director.' I guess maybe some of it I felt I had to do in spite of them, too."

Career

Education and early films (1969–1979)
Zemeckis first attended Northern Illinois University in DeKalb, Illinois, and gained early experience in film as a film cutter for NBC News in Chicago during a summer break. He also edited commercials in his home state. Zemeckis applied to transfer from NIU to the University of Southern California's School of Cinematic Arts in Los Angeles, California and went into the Film School on the strength of an essay and a music video based on a Beatles song. Not having heard from the university itself, Zemeckis called and was told he had been rejected because of his average grades. He gave an "impassioned plea" to the official on the other line, promising to go to summer school and improve his studies, and eventually convinced the school to accept him. 

Arriving at USC that fall, Zemeckis encountered a program that was, in his words, made up of "a bunch of hippies [and] considered an embarrassment by the university". The classes were difficult, with professors constantly stressing how hard the movie business was. Zemeckis remembered not being much fazed by this, citing the "healthy cynicism" that had been bred into him from his Chicago upbringing.

At USC Zemeckis met a fellow student, writer Bob Gale. Gale later recalled, "The graduate students at USC had this veneer of intellectualism...So Bob and I gravitated toward one another because we wanted to make Hollywood movies. We weren't interested in the French New Wave. We were interested in Clint Eastwood and James Bond and Walt Disney, because that's how we grew up." Zemeckis graduated from USC in 1973, and he and Gale cowrote the unproduced screenplays Tank and Bordello of Blood, which they pitched to John Milius, the latter of which was later developed into a film which was released in 1996.

As a result of winning a Student Academy Award at USC for his film A Field of Honor, Zemeckis came to the attention of Steven Spielberg. Spielberg said, "He barged right past my secretary and sat me down and showed me this student film...and I thought it was spectacular, with police cars and a riot, all dubbed to Elmer Bernstein's score for The Great Escape." Spielberg became Zemeckis's mentor and executive produced his first two films, both of which Gale and Zemeckis co-wrote.

I Wanna Hold Your Hand (1978), starring Nancy Allen, and  Used Cars (1980), starring Kurt Russell, were well received critically but were commercial failures. I Wanna Hold Your Hand was the first of several Zemeckis films to incorporate historic figures and celebrities into his movies. In the film, he used archival footage and doubles to simulate the presence of The Beatles. After the failure of his first two films, and the Spielberg-directed bomb 1941 in 1979 (for which Zemeckis and Gale had written the screenplay), the pair gained a reputation for writing "scripts that everyone thought were great [but] somehow didn't translate into movies people wanted to see."

Breakthrough and Forrest Gump  (1980–1997)
As a result of his reputation within the industry, Zemeckis had trouble finding work in the early 1980s, though he and Gale kept busy. They wrote scripts for other directors, including Car Pool for Brian De Palma and Growing Up for Spielberg; neither ended up getting made. Another Zemeckis-Gale project, Back to the Future, about a teenager who accidentally travels back in time to the 1950s, was turned down by every major studio. The director was jobless until Michael Douglas hired him in 1984 to direct Romancing the Stone. A romantic adventure starring Douglas and Kathleen Turner, Romancing was expected to flop (to the point that, after viewing a rough cut of the film, the producers of the then-in-the-works Cocoon fired Zemeckis as director), but the film became a sleeper hit. While working on Romancing the Stone, Zemeckis met composer Alan Silvestri, who has scored all his subsequent pictures.

After Romancing, Zemeckis had the clout to direct his time-traveling screenplay. Starring Michael J. Fox, Lea Thompson, Crispin Glover, and Christopher Lloyd, the 1985 film was wildly successful upon its release and was followed by two sequels, released as Back to the Future Part II in 1989 and Back to the Future Part III in 1990. Before the Back to the Future sequels were released, Zemeckis collaborated with Disney and directed another film, the madcap 1940s-set mystery Who Framed Roger Rabbit, which combined traditional animation and live-action; its $70 million budget made it one of the most expensive films made up to that point. The film was both a financial and critical success and won three Academy Awards. In 1990, Zemeckis commented, when asked if he would want to make non-comedies, "I would like to be able to do everything. Just now, though, I'm too restless to do anything that's not really zany."

In 1992, Zemeckis directed the black comedy Death Becomes Her, starring Meryl Streep, Goldie Hawn and Bruce Willis. Although his next film would have some comedic elements, it was Zemeckis's first with dramatic elements and was also his biggest commercial success to date, Forrest Gump. Starring Tom Hanks in the title role, Forrest Gump tells the story of a man with a low I.Q., who unwittingly participates in some of the major events of the twentieth century, falls in love, and interacts with several major historical figures in the process. The film grossed $677 million worldwide and became the top-grossing US film of 1994; it won six Academy Awards, including Best Picture, Best Actor (for Hanks) and Best Director (for Zemeckis). From this point, Hanks would continue acting for Zemeckis in subsequent films and they became considered frequent collaborators. In 1997, Zemeckis directed Contact, a long-gestating project based on Carl Sagan's 1985 novel of the same name. The film centers on Eleanor Arroway, a scientist played by Jodie Foster, who believes she has made contact with extraterrestrial beings. In the early 1990s, he founded South Side Amusement Company, which later became ImageMovers.

During this same time period, Zemeckis was an executive producer of HBO's "Tales from the Crypt" (1989–1996) and directed three episodes of the series.

Later work, 1999–present
In 1999, Zemeckis donated $5 million towards the Robert Zemeckis Center for Digital Arts at USC, a  center. When the Center opened in March 2001, Zemeckis spoke in a panel about the future of film, alongside friends Steven Spielberg and George Lucas. Of those (including Spielberg) who clung to celluloid and disparaged the idea of shooting digitally, Zemeckis said, "These guys are the same ones who have been saying that LPs sound better than CDs. You can argue that until you're blue in the face, but I don't know anyone who's still buying vinyl. The film, as we have traditionally thought of it, is going to be different. But the continuum is man's desire to tell stories around the campfire. The only thing that keeps changing is the campfire." The Robert Zemeckis Center currently hosts many film school classes, much of the Interactive Media Division, and Trojan Vision, USC's student television station, which has been voted the number one college television station in the country.

In 1996, Zemeckis had begun developing a project titled The Castaway with Tom Hanks and writer William Broyles Jr. The story, which was inspired by Robinson Crusoe, is about a man who becomes stranded on a desert island and undergoes a profound physical and spiritual change. While working on The Castaway, Zemeckis also became attached to a Hitchcockian thriller titled What Lies Beneath, the story of a married couple experiencing an extreme case of empty nest syndrome that was based on an idea by Steven Spielberg. Because Hanks' character needed to undergo a dramatic weight loss over the course of The Castaway (retitled Cast Away for release), Zemeckis decided that the only way to retain the same crew while Hanks lost the weight was to shoot What Lies Beneath in between. He shot the first part of Cast Away in early 1999, and shot What Lies Beneath in fall 1999, completing work on Cast Away in early 2000. Zemeckis later quipped, when asked about shooting two films back-to-back, "I wouldn't recommend it to anyone." What Lies Beneath, starring Harrison Ford and Michelle Pfeiffer, was released in July 2000 to mixed reviews, but did well at the box office, grossing over $155 million domestically. Cast Away was released that December and grossed $233 million domestically; Hanks received an Oscar nomination for Best Actor for his portrayal of Chuck Noland.

In 2004, Zemeckis reteamed with Hanks and directed The Polar Express, based on the children's book of the same name by Chris Van Allsburg. The Polar Express utilized the computer animation technique known as performance capture, whereby the movements of the actors are captured digitally and used as the basis for the animated characters. As the first major film to use performance capture, The Polar Express caused The New York Times to write that, "Whatever critics and audiences make of this movie, from a technical perspective it could mark a turning point in the gradual transition from an analog to a digital cinema."

In February 2007, Zemeckis and Walt Disney Studios chairman Dick Cook announced plans for a new performance capture film company devoted to CG-created, 3-D movies. The company, ImageMovers Digital, created films using the performance capture technology, with Zemeckis directing most of the projects which Disney distributed and marketed worldwide. Zemeckis used the performance capture technology again in his film, Beowulf, to retell the Anglo-Saxon epic poem of the same name. It featured Ray Winstone, Angelina Jolie, and Anthony Hopkins. Neil Gaiman, who co-wrote the adaptation with Roger Avary, described the film as a "cheerfully violent and strange take on the Beowulf legend." The film was released on November 16, 2007, to mostly positive reviews and grossed $196 million worldwide.

In July 2007, Variety announced that Zemeckis had written a screenplay for A Christmas Carol, based on Charles Dickens' 1843 short story of the same name, with plans to use performance capture and release it under the aegis of ImageMovers Digital. Zemeckis wrote the script with Jim Carrey in mind, and Carrey agreed to play a multitude of roles in the film, including Ebenezer Scrooge as a young, middle-aged, and old man, and the three ghosts who haunt Scrooge. The film began production in February 2008 and was released on November 6, 2009, to mixed reviews and grossed $325 million at the box office. Actor Gary Oldman also appeared in the film. Zemeckis is an avid supporter of 3-D Digital Cinema and has stated that since the 3-D presentations of Beowulf, all of his future films would be done in 3-D using digital motion capture. He has reportedly backed away from that statement and said that the decision to use 3-D will be on a film-by-film basis.

On August 19, 2009, it was reported that Zemeckis and his company were in talks with Apple Corps Ltd to remake the animated film Yellow Submarine in 3-D once again utilizing performance capture. However, on March 12, 2010, with Zemeckis' biggest Disney ally gone, former chairman Dick Cook, and amid drastic cost-cutting by the new management team, Disney announced that it was ending its relationship with ImageMovers Digital. The studio's final film, 2011's Zemeckis-produced Mars Needs Moms, was the second-worst box office failure in history, with a net loss of roughly $130 million. Zemeckis made his return to live-action filmmaking with Flight, a 2012 drama for Paramount, starring Denzel Washington.

On January 31, 2014, it was announced that a stage musical adaptation of Zemeckis' first Back to the Future film was in production. The show would be co-written by original writers Robert Zemeckis and Bob Gale. According to Gale, the musical would be "true to the spirit of the film without being a slavish remake".

In August 2008, IGN revealed in an interview with Philippe Petit that Zemeckis was working with Petit to turn Petit's memoir To Reach the Clouds into a feature film. In 2015, he directed the true story The Walk, which is about Philippe Petit (Joseph Gordon-Levitt) and his ambition to tightrope walk between the towers of the World Trade Center.

Paramount Pictures and 20th Century Fox announced in February 2015 that Zemeckis would direct Brad Pitt in Allied, a romantic thriller set during World War II. The film was released on November 23, 2016. Next, Zemeckis directed the fantasy drama Welcome to Marwen, starring Steve Carell, which was released in December 2018 to mixed reviews and flopped at the box office. Zemeckis' film The Witches, an adaptation of the Roald Dahl novel of the same name, premiered on October 22, 2020, on HBO Max.

On October 18, 2019, it was announced that Zemeckis is in talks to direct Disney's live-action adaptation of Pinocchio. Zemeckis was officially announced as the film's director and co-writer of the script in January 2020. In addition, Tom Hanks was reportedly announced as playing Mister Geppetto in the film, marking the fourth collaboration with Hanks since Forrest Gump, Cast Away, and The Polar Express. The film received negative reviews from critics, garnering only six Razzie nominations, including Worst Picture and Worst Director for Zemeckis.

On February 17, 2022, Zemeckis signed on to direct Here, an adaptation of the graphic novel by Richard McGuire, with Tom Hanks set to star and Forrest Gump screenwriter Eric Roth working on the screenplay with Zemeckis. On May 11, it was announced that Robin Wright had been cast and that Sony Pictures Classics had acquired distribution rights for the United States, with Miramax handling international sales and production expected to begin in September 2022 for a theatrical release in 2023.

Personal life
Zemeckis has said that, for a long time, he sacrificed his personal life in favor of a career. "I won an Academy Award when I was 44 years old," he explained, "but I paid for it with my 20s. That decade of my life from film school till 30 was nothing but work, nothing but absolute, driving work. I had no money. I had no life." In the early 1980s, Zemeckis married actress Mary Ellen Trainor, with whom he had a son, Alexander Francis. He described the marriage as difficult to balance with filmmaking, and his relationship with Trainor eventually ended in divorce. On December 4, 2001, he married Leslie Harter, an actress, with whom he has three children.

Zemeckis is a private pilot who has logged approximately 1,600 hours of flight time . He flies a Cirrus SR20, known for having a parachute that, under certain conditions, can lower the plane to the ground in case of an emergency.

According to campaign donation records, Zemeckis has frequently contributed to political candidates affiliated with the Democratic Party, as well as PACs that support the interests of aircraft owners and pilots, family planning interests, and a group that advocates for Hollywood women.

Filmography

Short films

Feature films

Television

Accolades
Major awards

Other awards

In 1996, Zemeckis received the Golden Plate Award of the American Academy of Achievement presented by Awards Council member George Lucas.
On November 5, 2004, Zemeckis received a star on the Hollywood Walk of Fame for his work in Motion Picture at 6925 Hollywood Blvd.

Accolades received by individual films

See also
 Directors with two films rated A+ by CinemaScore
 Robert Zemeckis' unproduced projects

References

External links

1951 births
American animated film directors
American animated film producers
American Cinema Editors
American people of Italian descent
American male screenwriters
American people of Lithuanian descent
American science fiction writers
American writers of Italian descent
Animation screenwriters
Best Directing Academy Award winners
Best Director Golden Globe winners
Comedy film directors
Directors Guild of America Award winners
Fantasy film directors
Horror film directors
Film directors from California
Film producers from California
Film directors from Illinois
Film producers from Illinois
Hugo Award-winning writers
Living people
Northern Illinois University alumni
People from Santa Barbara, California
Postmodernist filmmakers
Science fiction film directors
Screenwriters from California
Screenwriters from Illinois
Student Academy Award winners
USC School of Cinematic Arts alumni
Writers from Chicago